The nagaika is a short, thick whip with round cross-section used by Cossacks, borrowed from Nogai people, hence the original name "nogaika", or "Nogai's whip". It is also called камча, kamcha from the Turkic word "kamci" for "whip". The latter word is also used for short whips of Central Asian origin.

The nagaika was made out of leather strips by braiding. It was possible to have a piece of metal at the tip of the whip.

The main purpose of a nagaika was to urge a horse. A metal piece was used for defense against wolves. According to Vladimir Dahl's "Explanatory Dictionary of the Live Great Russian language", this nagayka was called volkoboy (волкобой, "wolf-slayer").

In modern times the descriptions of the military use of nagaika tend to be mythologized, and in the past the prime and predominant use was to drive horse. At the same time nagaika was known to be used against unarmed people, e.g., for corporal punishment or to disperse public disorders (e.g., during Russian Revolutions), so that a cossack with nagayka has become a symbol of tsarist oppression. 

In 2005 the Cossacks were reformed and armed with nagaikas in addition to other traditional weapons. In 2014, members of Pussy Riot were attacked by Cossacks wielding nagaikas and pepper spray while protesting.

Gallery

References

External links
"Nagayka", construction and technique (an excerpt from the book Г. Э. Адамович, Р. И. Федин "Владение холодным оружием (казачьи техники)") 
"Вольная станица" design and kinds 

Whips
Cossack culture